Pierre Étienne Rémillieux (1811–1856) was a French painter.

Rémillieux was born in Vienne, Isère.  He was a pupil of Claude Bonnefond and Augustin Thiérrat in the École nationale des beaux-arts de Lyon. He exhibited in the Salon de Paris (1841–1855), where he was awarded a third class medal in 1841 and a second class one in 1847.  He died in Lyon.

Museums 

 Lyon, Musée des Beaux-Arts, Groupe de fleurs dans une coupe de fleurs, Fleurs et fruits.
 Montpellier, Musée Fabre, Vase de Fleurs.

Auctions 

 Paris, 18 /12/ 1995, Enfant posant devant une balustrade et tenant un arc et une flèche, huile sur toile, 23,000 FF.
 New York, Sotheby's, 24 /10/ 1996  Poire, pêches et prunes sur un entablement, huile sur toile, $9200.

Sources 

Gazette des Beaux-Arts, 1861, volume 10, 104, 165.
Elisabeth Hardouin-Fugier et Etienne Graffe, Les Peintres de fleurs en France de Redouté à Redon, Les Éditions de l’amateur, Paris, 1992.

1811 births
1856 deaths
People from Vienne, Isère
19th-century French painters
French male painters
19th-century French male artists